Catalogus Codicum Astrologorum Graecorum (CCAG) is a 12-volume (including appendices) catalogue of astrological writings in Greek. The CCAG edited, described, and excerpted from texts found in libraries throughout Europe, most edited and catalogued for the first time. The CCAG was published between 1898 and 1953 in Brussels.  The chief editors in the earlier period of publication were Franz Cumont and Franz Boll.  The CCAG was described as the "most important" modern survey of Greek astrological writings.

Notes

External links
Catalog Record: Catalogus codicum astrologorum graecorum | Hathi Trust Digital Library (Includes search of texts)
Catalogus Codicum Astrologorum Graecorum – Wikisource (Includes list of whole texts available through the Internet Archive)
CCAG on the Hellenistic Astrology Texts Page (Contains scans of several volumes of the CCAG that are in the public domain)

Western astrology
Ancient Greek works
Astrological texts
Book series introduced in 1898